Robert Pevnik (born 18 February 1969) is a Slovenian football manager and former player who is the manager of Slovenian club Aluminij.

References

External links
NZS profile 

1969 births
Living people
Sportspeople from Celje
Slovenian footballers
Association football defenders
NK Celje players
FC Koper players
NK Olimpija Ljubljana (1945–2005) players
NK Rudar Velenje players
NK Ivančna Gorica players
Slovenian PrvaLiga players
Slovenian football managers
NK Domžale managers
NK Olimpija Ljubljana (2005) managers
NK Rudar Velenje managers
ND Mura 05 managers
FK Rabotnički managers
NK Celje managers
Legionovia Legionowo managers
Slovenian expatriate football managers
Expatriate football managers in Poland
Slovenian expatriate sportspeople in Poland